Harry Nye may refer to:

 Harry Gale Nye Jr. (1908–1987), American industrialist, entrepreneur, and sailor
 Harry Hess Nye (1887–1954), president of Elizabethtown College